Penance is a 2019 Irish historical drama film directed by Tom Collins and set in Ulster during 1916 and 1969. It stars Peter Coonan as an Irish nationalist Catholic priest who recruits a boy to the cause, only to regret his actions decades later.

Production
Penance was filmed in Ramelton, County Donegal and Derry, Northern Ireland and is primarily in the Irish language. Filming in Derry took place at St Columba's Church, Long Tower, on Bishop Street and Society Street, as those areas had changed little since the 1960s.

It was based on the Pádraic Ó Conaire story "Seacht mBua an Éirí Amach" ("Seven Virtues of the [Easter] Rising").

Production was financed by TG4, the Broadcasting Authority of Ireland, the Irish Film Board (€150,000), the Irish Language Broadcast Fund, Northern Ireland Screen and Section 481.

Plot

Derry, 1969. Catholic priest Fr. Eoin McDonnell prevents the arrest of Antaine, a senior Irish Republican Army commandant. Fr. Eoin casts his mind back to rural County Donegal in 1916, when he recruited a teenage Antaine into the Irish independence movement.

Cast

1916
 Peter Coonan as Fr. Eoin McDonnell (young)
Padhraig Parkinson as Antaine (young)
Barry Barnes as Inspector Joyce
Mimi Carroll as Mairéad
Diona Doherty as Ellie Nic Shiubhlaigh
Dara Devaney as Peadar

1969

Terry Byrne as Fr. Eoin McDonnell (old) 
 Gerard McSorley as Murray
 Barry McGovern as Antaine (old)
Corey McKinley as Feidhlím

Release

Penance was released on 1 May 2018.

The film received its TV premiere on TG4 on 20 April 2019.

References

External links
 

2018 drama films
County Donegal in fiction
Easter Rising
Films about The Troubles (Northern Ireland)
Films set in 1916
Films set in 1969
Films set in Ireland
Films shot in County Donegal
Films shot in Northern Ireland
Irish drama films
Irish-language films
English-language Irish films